Lourdes Domínguez Lino and Paola Suárez were the defending champions, but Suárez retired from the sport on September 1, 2007, and only Domínguez Lino competed that year. She partnered with Arantxa Parra Santonja, but lost in the semifinals to Iveta Benešová and Bethanie Mattek.

Iveta Benešová and Bethanie Mattek won in the final 6–3, 6–3, against Jelena Kostanić Tošić and Martina Müller.

Seeds

Draw

Draw

External links
Main Draw

Doubles
Copa Colsanitas